Nani Soedarsono (28 March 1928 in Purwodadi – 16 February 2019 in Jakarta) was an Indonesian politician who served as Minister of Social Welfare between 1983 and 1988.

References

1928 births
2019 deaths
Government ministers of Indonesia
Gadjah Mada University alumni
People from Grobogan Regency